Kristen K. Langer (born August 17, 1969) is an American politician who served as a member of the South Dakota Senate for the 25th district from 2017 to 2021. She was appointed by Governor Dennis Daugaard to the South Dakota House of Representatives after Jon Hansen resigned. In 2019, she became the South Dakota State Senate Majority Leader.

Elections

South Dakota House of Representatives
2014 Langer ran for the South Dakota House of Representatives where she and Republican Roger Hunt ran unopposed in the November 4, 2014, general election; Hunt received 4,601 votes and Langer received 4,367 votes.

South Dakota State Senate

2016 Langer ran for election to the South Dakota State Senate against Democrat Jeff Barth, whom she defeated in the November 8, 2016, general election by a margin of 7,254 to 4,301.
 2018 Langer ran for reelection against Independent Brian Wirth and Independent Peter Kiebanoff in the November 6, 2018 general election and won receiving 6,583 votes; Wirth received 1,931 votes and Kiebanoff received 1,15 votes.
 2020 Langer was uncontested for the Republican nomination but drew two Independent challengers for the general election. On August 4, 2020, Langer announced she would not seek re-election to the state senate, but would complete her term.

Controversy

Admonishment by State Senate
On March 30, 2020, during a late-night session of the legislature Langer was accused by fellow State Senator Phil Jensen of being intoxicated at the Capitol. In April 2020, a bipartisan committee established to look into the allegations against Langer and President Pro Tempe Brock Greenfield, voted 9-0 to admonish both of Langer and Greenfield for their conduct. During the hearing, Langer and Greenfield acknowledged drinking alcohol during a break in Senate proceedings and apologized "for this bad judgment on our part and for any delay this may have brought about for other members."

References

External links
Official page at the South Dakota Legislature
 

1969 births
21st-century American politicians
21st-century American women politicians
Living people
Republican Party members of the South Dakota House of Representatives
People from Dell Rapids, South Dakota
Place of birth missing (living people)
Republican Party South Dakota state senators
Women state legislators in South Dakota